Hope fraction is a parliamentary group in the Iranian Parliament, established after 2016 elections by reformists and pro-Rouhani administration politicians.

At the 7 May 2016 inaugural convention, they claimed 158 MPs attended the event, including every female and two Armenian minority representatives, and thus holding majority in the Parliament. At the second convention, Mohammad Reza Aref was elected as the parliamentary leader by 105 MPs, a number less than 146 seats needed for a majority.

References

Iranian Parliament fractions
2016 establishments in Iran
10th legislature of the Islamic Republic of Iran